New Orleans Lager and Ale Brewing Company, commonly called "NOLA Brewing Company," is a brewery in New Orleans, Louisiana, USA.  The brewery is located in a converted old warehouse building at the corner of Tchoupitoulas and Seventh Streets in Uptown New Orleans. 

Following the closure of the Dixie Brewing Company facility after Hurricane Katrina in 2005, no commercial brewery operated in New Orleans until NOLA Brewing Company produced its first craft beer in 2009. They celebrated their 7th year of production in 2016 with special releases.

NOLA Brewing Company is currently served in bars throughout the Southeast United States, as well as full sized kegs and draft packs sold at grocery stores throughout Louisiana.

See also
Beer in the United States
List of breweries in Louisiana
Microbrewery

References

External links

 New Orleans Lager and Ale Brewing Company
 Louisiana Brewery Trail

Beer brewing companies based in Louisiana
Buildings and structures in New Orleans
Food and drink companies_of New Orleans
Manufacturing companies based in New Orleans
Tourist attractions in New Orleans
Uptown New Orleans
American companies established in 2009
Food and drink companies established in 2009
2009 establishments in Louisiana